Big 5 Sporting Goods is a sporting goods retailer headquartered in El Segundo, California with 434 stores in Arizona, California, Colorado, Idaho, Nevada, New Mexico, Oregon, Texas, Utah, Washington and Wyoming. Steven G. Miller is the chairman, president, and CEO. 

The name Big 5 is derived from the first five stores that were opened in California. Sportswest and Sportsland were acquired in May 1988 from Pay 'n Save subsequently. A list of major competitors can be found on this list of sporting goods retailers of the United States.

References 

Companies listed on the Nasdaq
Sporting goods brands
Companies based in El Segundo, California
Sporting goods retailers of the United States
Retail companies established in 1955
1955 establishments in California
2002 initial public offerings